Parabacillus is a genus of short-horn walkingsticks in the family Heteronemiidae. There are at least three described species in Parabacillus.

Species
These three species belong to the genus Parabacillus:
 Parabacillus coloradus (Scudder, 1893) (Colorado short-horn walkingstick)
 Parabacillus hesperus Hebard, 1934 (western short-horn walkingstick)
 Parabacillus palmeri (Caudell, 1903)

References

Further reading

External links

 

Phasmatodea